The 1996 Toronto Argonauts season was the 107th season for the team since the franchise's inception in 1873. The team finished in first place in the East Division with a 15–3 record and qualified for the playoffs after missing out during the previous season when they finished 4–14. The 11 win improvement was the greatest single-season turnaround in franchise history and the team's 15 regular season wins was the most ever recorded by an Argonaut team. In the playoffs, the Argonauts defeated the newly relocated Montreal Alouettes in the Eastern Final and qualified for the 84th Grey Cup. Toronto defeated the Edmonton Eskimos by a score of 43–37, the second highest scoring Grey Cup game in history, and won their 13th Grey Cup championship.

Offseason

CFL draft

Preseason

Regular season

Season standings

Regular season

Postseason

Awards and records
Doug Flutie, Most Outstanding Player Award
Doug Flutie, Terry Evanshen Trophy
Mike Kiselak, Outstanding Offensive Lineman

1996 CFL All-Stars
QB – Doug Flutie
FB – Robert Drummond
C – Mike Kiselak
OT – Chris Perez
DT – Rob Waldrop
ST – Jimmy Cunningham
WR- Terrance Lawrence

References

Toronto Argonauts seasons
James S. Dixon Trophy championship seasons
Grey Cup championship seasons